Echoes of the Rainbow (romanisation: Shui Yuet Sun Tau; literally "Time, the Thief") is a 2010 Hong Kong drama film directed by Alex Law and starring Simon Yam and Sandra Ng. It won the Crystal Bear for the Best Film in the Children’s Jury "Generation Kplus" category at the 2010 Berlin Film Festival.

It tells the story of a working family in Hong Kong whose eldest son, a popular boy and star athlete, becomes ill with leukemia.

The film is set in 1960s British Hong Kong and was shot on the historical Wing Lee Street in Sheung Wan. It was financed by the Hong Kong government's Film Development Fund.

Plot
The story revolves around the Law family, including parents Mr. and Mrs. Law and their sons, Desmond Law Chun-yat and Law Chun-yi (a.k.a. Big Ears., who is also the film's narrator). They live in a shoe shop on Wing Lee Street, Sheung Wan, in late 1960s Hong Kong. Chun-yi is mischievous, prank-playing and has a poor attitude towards learning, which he often ends up getting scolded for by his parents and teachers. In contrast, his elder brother Desmond is a top grade earner, talented musician, and champion runner who attends the prestigious Diocesan Boys' School. He is profoundly loved by his classmates and teachers. He also has a girlfriend, Flora, who was born to an affluent family. Flora and her family's immigration from Hong Kong to the United States lead Desmond's grades and performance at school to decline. He also gradually becomes aware of the inequalities in Hong Kong society of that time, both through interactions with a cocky British policeman who extorts money from his father in exchange for letting them keep their shop (and who insists that Desmond will never be successful because his English isn't good enough) and through his first time seeing the inside of Flora's family's mansion.

Not long before Flora leaves, Desmond's grades start declining and he takes third place in a race he had hoped to win. One day, after a typhoon nearly destroys the family's house, Desmond collapses and his father takes him to the hospital, where he is diagnosed with leukemia. His parents search for a doctor who can cure him but find none, and his condition worsens until he has to remain in the hospital, where the nurses maltreat him and extort money from his parents in exchange for basic care. Chun-yi, who spends much of his free time stealing trinkets around town, tries to offer them all to his brother in an attempt to cheer him up, but Desmond doesn't accept any of them. Flora returns from the United States and visits him in the hospital, where they share their first kiss, but Desmond dies shortly thereafter.

Years later Chun-yi, narrating retrospectively, remarks that "time is the greatest thief". In the film's final scene, Chun-yi and his mother are shown visiting Desmond's grave, and Chun-yi, now a teenager, recounts a lesson Desmond had taught him about double rainbows.

Cast
 Simon Yam as Mr. Law
 Sandra Ng as Mrs. Law
 Aarif Lee as Desmond Law (aka Law Chun-yat). Lee also portrayed Chun-yi as a teenager in the epilogue 
 Buzz Chung as Law Chun-yi
 Evelyn Choi as Flora Lau (aka Lau Fong-fei)
 Paul Chun as Big Uncle/barber
 Lawrence Ah Mon as Goldfish Seller
 Jean-Michel Sourd as French teacher

Reception

China Daily placed the film on their list of the best ten Chinese films of 2010.

Wing Lee Street, where Echoes of the Rainbow was shot, was originally included in a redevelopment plan. However, the Berlinale award won by the film stimulated the wish of Hong Kong people to preserve this heritage site and community. The Town Planning Board eventually decided to keep all the tong laus on the street and to designate the region as a preservation site.

Awards and nominations
 29th Hong Kong Film Awards
 Won: Best Screenplay (Alex Law)
 Won: Best Actor (Simon Yam)
 Nominated: Best Actress (Sandra Ng)
 Won: Best New Performer (Aarif Lee)
 Nominated: Best New Performer (Chung Shiu To)
 Won: Best Original Film Song (Lowell Lo, Alex Law and Aarif Lee)
 60th Berlin International Film Festival
  Crystal Bear for the Best Film in the Children’s Jury "Generation Kplus"

See also
 List of submissions to the 83rd Academy Awards for Best Foreign Language Film
 List of Hong Kong submissions for the Academy Award for Best Foreign Language Film

References

External links
 

2010 films
2010 drama films
Hong Kong drama films
2010s Cantonese-language films
Films directed by Alex Law
2010s Hong Kong films